Jabera Assembly constituency is one of the 230 Vidhan Sabha (Legislative Assembly) constituencies of Madhya Pradesh state in central India. This constituency came into existence in 2008, following delimitation of the legislative assembly constituencies. Before delimitation, the area covered by this constituency was part of the erstwhile Nohata constituency abolished in 2008.

Overview
Jabera (constituency number 56) is one of the 4 Vidhan Sabha constituencies located in Damoh district. This constituency covers the entire Jabera and Tendukhera tehsils of the district.

Jabera is part of Damoh Lok Sabha constituency along with seven other Vidhan Sabha segments, namely, Pathariya, Damoh and Hatta in this district, Deori, Rehli and Banda in Sagar district and Malhara in Chhatarpur district.

Members of Legislative Assembly

See also
 Damoh district

References

Damoh district
Assembly constituencies of Madhya Pradesh